Rhododendron leptothrium (薄叶马银花) is a species of flowering plant in the family Ericaceae. The flowers are pale rose to magenta-purple.

It is a fairly tender species, not tolerating freezing conditions; and therefore of limited interest for cultivation purposes in temperate climates.

References

 "Rhododendron leptothrium", I. B. Balfour & Forrest, Notes Roy. Bot. Gard. Edinburgh. 11: 84. 1919.

leptothrium
Taxa named by Isaac Bayley Balfour
Taxa named by George Forrest (botanist)